Louis William "Red" Lutz (December 17, 1898 – February 22, 1984) was a Major League Baseball catcher who played with the Cincinnati Reds in one game on May 31, . He collected one hit, a double, in one at bat.

External links

Cincinnati Reds players
1898 births
1984 deaths
Baseball players from Ohio
Union City Greyhounds players